Defretinella is a genus of parasitic alveolates of the phylum Apicomplexa.

Taxonomy

This genus had been placed in the family Barrouxiidae by Levine but has since been moved to the family Eleutheroschizonidae.

There is one species recognised in this genus — Defretinella eulaliae.

Description

This species infects a polychete species  — the green leaf worm (Eulalia viridis).

The oocysts contain >50 bivalved sporocysts: each sporocyst in its turn contains numerous sporozoites. The sporocysts are bivalved.

References

Apicomplexa genera